Exidiopsis is a genus of fungi in the family Auriculariaceae. The genus has a widespread distribution and contains around 30 species. One species, Exidiopsis effusa, is responsible for the formation of hair ice on dead wood.

Species

Exidiopsis albopruinata
Exidiopsis alliciens
Exidiopsis badia
Exidiopsis banlaensis
Exidiopsis calcea
Exidiopsis cartilaginea
Exidiopsis citrina
Exidiopsis diversa
Exidiopsis effusa
Exidiopsis endoramifera
Exidiopsis galzinii
Exidiopsis griseobrunnea
Exidiopsis gypsea
Exidiopsis jianfengensis
Exidiopsis leucophaea
Exidiopsis macroacantha
Exidiopsis molybdea
Exidiopsis mucedinea
Exidiopsis novae-zelandiae
Exidiopsis opalea
Exidiopsis pallida
Exidiopsis paniculata
Exidiopsis pulverea
Exidiopsis punicea
Exidiopsis rufula
Exidiopsis scutelliformis
Exidiopsis sublivida
Exidiopsis succinea
Exidiopsis tawa
Exidiopsis tenuis
Exidiopsis tremellispora

References

External links

Auriculariales
Agaricomycetes genera